Catherine of Saxony may refer to:

 Catherine of Brunswick-Lüneburg (1395–1442), wife of Frederick I, Elector of Saxony 
 Catherine of Saxony, Electress of Brandenburg (1421–1476), daughter of Frederick I, Elector of Saxony and wife of Frederick II, Elector of Brandenburg
 Catherine of Saxony, Duchess of Münsterberg (1453–1534), daughter of William III, Landgrave of Thuringia and wife of Henry II, Duke of Münsterberg; also known as Catherine of Thuringia
 Catherine of Saxony, Archduchess of Austria (1468–1524), daughter of Albert III, Duke of Saxony and wife of Sigismund, Archduke of Austria
 Catherine of Mecklenburg (1487–1561), wife of Henry IV, Duke of Saxony